Shrewsbury and Atcham is a constituency represented in the House of Commons of the UK Parliament since 2005 by Daniel Kawczynski, a Conservative.

Boundaries

The constituency lies at the centre of Shropshire, a large inland county of England, bordering Wales.

The constituency is coextensive with that of the Central area of Shropshire Council (the same area as the former Shrewsbury and Atcham borough, after which the constituency was originally named).

Constituency profile
At its heart lies the town of Shrewsbury (2011 population 71,715), which is the county town of Shropshire. It is otherwise a rural constituency. Villages such as Bayston Hill, Ford, Dorrington, Condover, Minsterley, Pontesbury, Bomere Heath, Wroxeter and Atcham are included. Its southern edge is the northern side of the Shropshire Hills AONB. The landscape of the constituency features many small rivers which drain the fields and coppices into the upper plain of the River Severn, which cuts straight through the area. The main roads through the area are the A5 and A49, providing links to nearby Telford as well as North Wales and the cities of Birmingham and Manchester. The total population of the area is around 105,000.

History
The constituency was established in 1983, replacing the Shrewsbury constituency, although this change was in name only and not in its boundaries.

On 10 December 2001, following his demand for a parliamentary debate before military intervention in Afghanistan, the incumbent Labour member, Paul Marsden, left the government's benches to join the Liberal Democrats; he remained there until 5 April 2005, when he sought to show strong solidarity with Labour Stop the War MPs by returning to his old party, becoming the first politician to cross the floor twice since Winston Churchill. During much of his time with the Liberal Democrats, Marsden was a senior health spokesman, shadowing the Secretary of State for Health and ministers.

Shrewsbury and Atcham was part of the Shropshire region for the purpose of reporting the results of the 2016 United Kingdom European Union membership referendum; the region voted 56.9% in favour of leaving the European Union on a turnout of 77.5%.

Proposed constituency changes
Under constituency boundary proposals announced in September 2016 the seat would take from the Ludlow constituency the ward of Chirbury and Worthen. The constituency would also simply be titled Shrewsbury, dropping the "and Atcham" in reflection of the abolition in 2009 of the Shrewsbury and Atcham Borough Council.

Members of Parliament

Elections

Elections in the 2010s

Elections in the 2000s

Elections in the 1990s

Elections in the 1980s

See also
 Parliamentary constituencies in Shropshire
 Shrewsbury – pre-1983

Notes

References

Parliamentary constituencies in Shropshire
 
Constituencies of the Parliament of the United Kingdom established in 1983